Yujia may refer to:

 Yujia Township, Hebei (于家乡), in Jingxing County
 Yujia Township, Jiangxi (余家乡), in Guixi
 Li Yujia (李羽佳; b. 1983), Chinese Singaporean female badminton player
 Yuja Wang (王羽佳; b. 1987), Chinese classical pianist
 Tao Yujia (b. 1987), Chinese female 100-m sprinter

Mandarin Chinese Words 
Yoga Yújiā (瑜伽)